The 1908 Colgate football team was an American football team that represented Colgate University as an independent during the 1908 college football season. In its first and only season under head coach Edwin Sweetland, the team compiled a 4–3 record. Robert Whelan was the team captain. The team played its home games on Whitnall Field in Hamilton, New York.

Schedule

References

Colgate
Colgate Raiders football seasons
Colgate football